Garrynafela is a townland in Athlone, County Westmeath, Ireland. The townland is in the civil parish of St. Mary's.

The townland stands to the north of the town, on the shores of Coosan Lough, and to the south of Killinure Lough.

References 

Townlands of County Westmeath